The 2012 Open GDF Suez de Touraine was a professional tennis tournament played on indoor hard courts. It was the eighth edition of the tournament which was part of the 2012 ITF Women's Circuit. It took place in Joué-lès-Tours, France on 8–14 October 2012.

WTA entrants

Seeds 

 1 Rankings are as of 1 October 2012.

Other entrants 
The following players received wildcards into the singles main draw:
  Julie Coin
  Clothilde de Bernardi
  Amandine Hesse
  Constance Sibille

The following players received entry from the qualifying draw:
  Diāna Marcinkēviča
  Anna Remondina
  Ana Vrljić
  Maryna Zanevska

The following players received entry by a Junior Exempt:
  An-Sophie Mestach

Champions

Singles 

  Monica Puig def.  Maria João Koehler, 3–6, 6–4, 6–1

Doubles 

  Séverine Beltrame /  Julie Coin def.  Justyna Jegiołka /  Diāna Marcinkēviča, 7–5, 6–4

External links 
 2012 Open GDF Suez de Touraine at ITFTennis.com
 Official website

Open GDF Suez de Touraine
2012 in French tennis
Open de Touraine